Wenceslao "Ben" Zubiri (September 28, 1911 – November 9, 1969), who was also known as Iyo Karpo was a Cebuano composer, actor, and media personality in the Philippines.  His most famous composition, for which he wrote both the lyrics and music, is the song Matud Nila (in English "They Say").

Zubiri was born on the island of Cebu in 1911 and started his schooling in San Nicolas Elementary School.  From an early age, he was said to have displayed an ability in singing and music.

He had a role in the movie Bertoldo-Balodoy, which was the first Cebuano film that was ever released.  Ben Zubiri also wrote Cebuano songs.  In 1941 he wrote his most famous song, Matud Nila. This song has been labeled by some as the cultural anthem of the Cebuanos.  He also was a comedian in radio dramas as well as offering advice on the program Purico Amateur Hour.

Ben Zubiri died in 1969. He was married to Luz Butalid, a Boholana, whom he met while he was in Bohol as a guerilla fighter during the Second World War.

A street in Barangay Labangon in Cebu City was later named in Zubiri's honor.

List of selected compositions

Matud Nila (1941)
Ikaduhang Bathala
Katulog Na Inday
Nganong Mipakita Ka
Tuhoi
Mitu-o Ako
Ang Gugmang Gibati Ko
Pasayawa ko Day

Award

References

External links
Ngkhai.com biography of Ben Zubiri

Filipino folk composers
Musicians from Cebu
Male actors from Cebu
1911 births
1969 deaths